Lisa Geary (born 7 November 1961) is a Canadian former swimmer. She competed in the women's 800 metre freestyle at the 1976 Summer Olympics.

References

External links
 

1961 births
Living people
Canadian female freestyle swimmers
Olympic swimmers of Canada
Swimmers at the 1976 Summer Olympics
People from Grande Prairie
Sportspeople from Alberta